The Mocking of Christ (German: Die Verspottung Christi) is an early oil on wood painting (1503–1505) by Matthias Grünewald. It is located today in the Alte Pinakothek, Munich.

Description
Christ sits blindfolded on a low stone wall. His hands and arms are bound with a rope. A torturer who pulls on the rope stands before him, with his back turned to the viewer. Another stands behind Christ and tugs on his hair and has raised his fist to strike him. On the right a man with a staff in his left hand and with his other holds back the second torturer, who appears not to notice him.

An older man faces the man with the staff, and lays his hands upon the latter's shoulders, and appears to be conversing with him. In the background are three further men: on the left a musician who plays a flute with one hand while beating a small drum with the other, a youth near the center of the image, and an older man on the right.

Details

See also
 Mocking of Jesus
 The Mocking of Christ (van Dyck)
 Christ Mocked

References
 Horst Ziermann, Erika Beissel; Matthias Grünewald, Prestel Verlag München, 2001, 
 Berta Reichenauer; Grünewald, Kulturverlag Thaur, 1992, 

Paintings depicting the Passion of Jesus
Paintings by Matthias Grünewald
1500s paintings
Collection of the Alte Pinakothek
Musical instruments in art
Torture in art